Clontibret is a village and parish in County Monaghan, Ireland. The village population in the 2016 census was 172. Clontibret is also a parish in both Roman Catholic and Church of Ireland traditions. The territory of the parish also includes Annyalla and Doohamlet as well as smaller settlements such as Cremartin, Scotch Corner and Lisnagrieve.

Location
The village of Clontibret is situated close to the border with Northern Ireland, between the towns of Monaghan and Castleblayney, along the N2 National primary road which links Dublin and Derry.

Parish
Clontibret is a parish in the Diocese of Clogher. The Catholic parish has three churches - St. Mary's, north of Clontibret village, St. Michael's, in the nearby village of Annyalla and All Saints, in the village of Doohamlet, which is between the towns of Castleblayney and Ballybay. The Anglican Church of Ireland church is located on the ancient Christian site in Clontibret village. The wider parish area has a population of approximately 3,000 persons.

The local Gaelic Athletic Association club and the Pipe Band in Clontibret are both named after Hugh O'Neill Earl of Tyrone (victor at the Battle of Clontibret 1595). For example, the local Gaelic games club is Clontibret O'Neills, which as founded in 1913.

History

In 1595 the adjacent countryside was the site of the Battle of Clontibret. The territory of Monaghan had been wrested from the control of the MacMahon clan in 1591 when the clan leader was executed by English authority. Subsequent encroachments by the English into the province of Ulster led to the Nine Years War (1595–1603). The battle was the earliest clash between the two sides, with the Irish led by Hugh O'Neill and the English by Sir Henry Bagenal. Although O'Neill won the battle, the war ended with the completion of the English conquest of Ireland. In 1610 the Plantation of Ulster was established, an event that still defines certain political allegiances in Northern Ireland.

On 7 August 1986, in protest at the Anglo-Irish Agreement, Northern Irish unionist politician Peter Robinson led an "invasion party" of 500 unionist militants into Clontibret. During what is sometimes called the "Clontibret invasion", the group held a military parade with drills in the square, before being forced by the Gardaí to retreat back across the border. Irish authorities claimed that there were no more than 150 militants. Two Gardaí were beaten by the mob, while Robinson and others were arrested, tried, and eventually fined for the incident. Riots took place at Dundalk during the trial of Robinson, where Ian Paisley, then leader of the Democratic Unionist Party (DUP) was attacked with stones and petrol bombs.

Gold discovery
In 2008 the village was in the media spotlight due to the discovery of a gold resource in the locality estimated in excess of 1 million ounces. This resource estimate, the result of work in the area by Dublin-based mineral exploration company Conroy Gold and Natural Resources, was believed by the company's directors to be the largest ever reported in Ireland and the UK.

People
 John Brennan, a Fianna Fáil member of Seanad Éireann from 1960 until 1977 was from Tassan, Clontibret.
 J. B. Bury (1861–1927), an historian, academic and professor of Roman history, was born in Clontribet. 
 Robert Gregg Bury (1869-1951), a clergyman, classicist, philologist, and a translator of Plato's works into English, was born in Clontribet and worked there as a curate in 1899–1900.
 Brendan Comiskey, former Roman Catholic Bishop of Ferns, County Wexford, was born in Tassan, Clontibret in 1935. He resigned as Bishop of Ferns in 2002 following allegations that he failed to deal with complaints of child sexual abuse in the Diocese of Ferns.
 Patrick Duffy, a seventeenth-century Roman Catholic Bishop of Clogher, is buried at what is now the Church of Ireland church. He was a native of Aughnamulen parish.
 John O'Neill, a Fenian general who led the ill-fated Fenian invasions of Canada in 1866, 1870 and 1871, was born at Drumgallon in Clontibret in 1839. After participating in the American Civil War, he joined the Fenians and later established an Irish colony in Nebraska where today the city of O'Neill, Nebraska is named after him.

See also

 List of towns and villages in Ireland
 Mass rocks in Clontibret

References

Towns and villages in County Monaghan